Gorkoye is a rural locality (a selo) in Laptevsky Selsoviet, Uglovsky District, Altai Krai, Russia. The population was 15 as of 2013. It was founded in 1900. There is 1 street.

Geography 
Gorkoye is located 41 km south of Uglovskoye (the district's administrative centre) by road. Pervye Korosteli is the nearest rural locality.

References 

Rural localities in Uglovsky District, Altai Krai